Breń may refer to the following places in Poland:
Breń, Lesser Poland Voivodeship
Breń, West Pomeranian Voivodeship

See also
Breń Osuchowski